The 2011–12 Bosnia and Herzegovina Football Cup is the seventieth season of Bosnia and Herzegovina's annual football cup, and a twelfth season of the unified competition.  The competition started on 14 September 2011 and concluded on 16 May 2012. The winner would have qualified to the second qualifying round of the 2012–13 UEFA Europa League, but as the cup was won by the league champion, the slot went to the second placed team in Premier league of Bosnia and Herzegovina, which was Široki Brijeg who also ended up as the runner-up of the cup.

The defending champions FK Željezničar, having won their 4th title the previous year by defeating NK Čelik in the final with an aggregate score of 4–0, managed to defend their title and claim their fifth one against Široki Brijeg in final which they won 1–0 on aggregate, completing the double for that season as they won the league title four days before the second leg of the final.

All top clubs entered from the first round of 32.

Participating clubs

The following 32 teams competed in Round 1: (Team in bold is the winner)

1 Of the 32 participants, the Federation of Bosnia and Herzegovina has 20 clubs, while the Republika of Srpska has 11. Brčko District is represented with just one club.

Calendar

Draw 

The draws for the round of 32 was conducted in Sarajevo at 12:00 (CEST) on 6 September 2011 in hotel "Art". All 32 clubs were in the same pot, resulting that every club could get any other club as his opponent. The first-drawn team served as hosts. Also the date for the matches was decided for 14 September 2011.

The draws for the round of 16 took place on 20 September 2011, once more at 12:00 (CEST) in Sarajevo in hotel "Evropa". The remaining 16 clubs were once more put in just one pot. The date for the matches was also decided and the matches will take part on 28. September, with the rematch 3 weeks later, on 19. October 2011.

The draws for the quarterfinals took place on 25 October 2011. The remaining 8 clubs will found themselves again just in one pot. The date for the matches was also confirmed. The dates were set for 2 November 2011 with the rematch three weeks later on 23 November 2011.

The draws for semifinal was conducted on 6 March 2012 in the halls of the Football Federation of Bosnia and Herzegovina. On the draw it was decided that the first match will be played on 14 March, with the rematch set for 4 April 2012.

The two winners will face each other in the final which is scheduled for 25 April and rematch on 16 May 2012. The host in the first leg was determined by a draw held on 10 April 2012 in the halls of Football Federation of Bosnia and Herzegovina. It was decided that the host of the first leg will be Željezničar, with Široki Brijeg hosting the second leg three weeks later.

Competition

Round of 32

This round consisted of 16 single-legged fixtures. All 32 clubs entered the competition from this round, while the matches were played on 14 September 2011.  In a case of a draw in the regular time, the winner would have been determined with a penalty shootout.

Note: Roman numerals in brackets denote the league tier the clubs participate in during the 2011–12 season.
Source: NFSBiH

Round of 16

The 16 winner continued their way to the final through this round. Unlike the last round, this round consisted of 8 two-legged fixtures. The date for the matches were determined with the draw which was held on 20 September. The first match took place on 28 September, while the rematch was scheduled three weeks after, on 19 October 2011.

|}
1 Roman numerals in brackets denote the league tier the clubs participate in during the 2011–12 season.
2 Indicates there is an article about it.
3 The match was abandoned after huligans of Zrinjski stormed the pitch and started to chase players of Velež with various items. The field storm took place in the last minutes of the game just after Velež scored for 0–1 against their city rivals. The disciplinary and contest commission decided to award a 0–3 win to Velež, suspended "Bijeli Brijeg", Zrinjski home stadium, for 5 matches and punished Zrinjski with a fine.
Source: NFSBiH

First leg

Second leg

Quarter-finals

The 8 winner from the previous round met their opponents in this round on the way to the final. This round consisted of 4 two-legged fixtures. The date for the matches was determined with the draw which was held on 25 October. The first match took place on 2 November, while the rematch was scheduled three weeks after, on 23 November 2011.

|}
1 Roman numerals in brackets denote the league tier the clubs participate in during the 2011–12 season.
2 Indicates there is an article about it.
Source: NFSBiH

First leg

Second leg

Semi-finals

The remaining 4 teams will play in this last round before the final. It will consist of 2 two-legged fixtures which will take part on 14 March and 4 April this year. The draw was done on 6 March.

|}

1 All teams are from Premier League of Bosnia and Herzegovina, the first league tier.
2 The game on Gradski stadion in Banja Luka was stopped in the 65-minute by result 0–1 for Željezničar when one of the assistant referees was hit by a solid object in the head. While medical care was given to the referee, the delegate first decided to empty the east stand, the stand where Lešinars (the ultras fans of Borac) are, where the object came from, but not long after, realizing the tension, because, as they say, "weird" actions by the main referee, while the east stand was emptying out, the delegate aborted the match. The disciplinary and contest commission decided to award Željezničar a 0–3 win and to punish Borac with a €5,000 fine and the next six home matches without spectators.
Source: NFSBiH

First leg

Second leg

Final

The final was contested between Željezničar and Široki Brijeg and played over a two-legged fixture. The date for the finals was set for 25 April and 16 May 2012.

|}
1 Both teams are from Premier League of Bosnia and Herzegovina, the first league tier.
2 Široki Brijeg was fined with 1500 € and the next home match without spectators because of oversights made in organization of the second leg of the final, including hitting Amar Osim with a solid object from the stands, a try by a supporter to trip the assistant referee nearly at the end of the game and very insulting chanting.
Source: NFSBiH

First leg

Second leg

Top goalscorers

1 Šaban Pehilj is a footballer of Željezničar. In the first halfseason he was loaned to Krajišnik, while in the second halfseason he was loaned to Kozara. He scored all of his goals for Krajišnik and hasn't played a single game in this competition for Kozara.

Media coverage

Only from quarter-finals and onwards selected matches were broadcast in B&H by BHT1 and Moja TV. BHT1 broadcast 4 live games, including both final matches, while Moja TV broadcast 2 live games.

These matches were broadcast live on television:

See also

2011–12 Premier League of Bosnia and Herzegovina
2011–12 First League of the Federation of Bosnia and Herzegovina
2011–12 First League of the Republika Srpska
2010–11 Kup Bosne i Hercegovine
Football Federation of Bosnia and Herzegovina

References

External links

facebook

Soccerway

worldfootball

 
Bosnia and Herzegovina Football Cup seasons
2011–12 in Bosnia and Herzegovina football
2011–12 domestic association football cups